Halvar Moritz (June 21, 1906 – November 21, 1993) was a Swedish cross-country skier who competed in the 1930s. He won a bronze medal in the 4 × 10 km relay at the 1935 FIS Nordic World Ski Championships.

Cross-country skiing results

World Championships
 1 medal – (1 bronze)

External links
World Championship results 

Swedish male cross-country skiers
FIS Nordic World Ski Championships medalists in cross-country skiing
1906 births
1993 deaths